Anders Randolf (December 18, 1870 – July 2, 1930)  was a Danish American actor in American films from 1913 to 1930.

Biography
Anders was born in Viborg, Denmark, where he became a professional soldier in the Danish army and a world-class swordsman. He emigrated to the United States in 1893 or 1895, quickly giving in to a lifelong passion for the theater. After briefly heading his own production company, Frontier Features, Inc., Randolf settled into a career as one of Hollywood's best screen villains.

Often billed as Anders Randolph, he appeared in character roles opposite such stars as John Barrymore (Sherlock Holmes 1922), Mary Pickford (Dorothy Vernon of Haddon Hall 1924), Douglas Fairbanks (The Black Pirate 1926), and Greta Garbo (The Kiss 1929). He also appeared in several comedy short films for Hal Roach alongside Charley Chase and Laurel and Hardy.

Randolf died on July 2, 1930, following a relapse after a kidney operation. He was later interred at Frederiksberg Cemetery in Copenhagen, Denmark.

Selected filmography

References

External links

 
 
Genealogy page for Anders Randolf

1870 births
1930 deaths
Danish male film actors
Danish male silent film actors
American male film actors
American male silent film actors
20th-century Danish male actors
20th-century American male actors
People from Viborg Municipality
Danish emigrants to the United States